EverQuote is an online insurance marketplace founded in 2011 and based in Cambridge, Massachusetts.

Description
EverQuote began as a marketplace for car insurance, but it has since expanded to home, health, and life insurance. 

The service provided by EverQuote is matching insurance-seekers with companies that others with similar profiles preferred in the past. EverQuote does not directly give quotes on insurance rates. Instead, it selects a few companies whose insurance products were bought by similar drivers in the past, and gives those companies the insurance-seeker's contact information. The company representatives then will quote prices for products they offer.

The company's revenue model is lead generation. Its service is free to insurance-seekers. According to the Boston Globe, "EverQuote collects referral fees from insurance providers when customers buy policies, but it doesn’t allow companies to pay to be included in its recommendations."

History
EverQuote was founded in Cambridge, Massachusetts, by Seth Birnbaum and Tomas Revesz, who met at MIT. Originally named AdHarmonics when it began in 2008, the company changed its name to Everquote in 2011, after creating its online insurance marketplace.

EverQuote was a part of the Cogo Labs incubator program run by the Massachusetts-based venture capital firm Link Ventures. In 2013, the company moved to its own office space.

In May 2015, MicroStrategy founder Sanju Bansal and Vestmark CEO John Lunny became members of the board of directors.  In October 2016, EverQuote received $23 million in Series B funding via Savano Capital Partners, Stratim Capital LLC and Oceanic Partners, and T Capital Partners.

In 2017, Everquote added $13 million to its previous $23M funding. At the same time, they added Mira Wilczek, CEO of Cogo Labs, to their board of directors, where she replaced Jonathan Shapiro.

In 2020, following the death of company founder Seth Birnbaum, he was replaced as CEO by the company's president Jayme Mendal.

Advertising
In 2016, EverQuote began an Internet advertising campaign featuring images of two young employees (not always the same two employees,) with text such as "How 2 math grads are disrupting the insurance industry." This juxtaposition suggested to many that the young people in the photo were founders of Everquote.

In response to controversy over the ads, co-founders Birnbaum and Revesz said that the photos were meant to showcase a "young, diverse" team at EverQuote. In March 2017, Everquote stated that they had paused the ads. Everquote said that future ads would end confusion about the roles of the young employees pictured.

EverDrive app
In 2016, EverQuote launched a new smartphone app called "EverDrive" to help drivers measure their driving safety, based on five criteria: phone use, speeding, accelerating, cornering and braking. Between 1/4 and 1/3 of drivers using this app upgraded their safety skills, over a period of four months, to earn better scores from the app.

See also
 Online marketplace

References

External links
 EverQuote website

American companies established in 2011
Internet properties established in 2011
2011 establishments in Massachusetts
Online marketplaces of the United States
Companies based in Cambridge, Massachusetts
Companies listed on the Nasdaq
2018 initial public offerings